Geastrum albonigrum is an inedible species of mushroom belonging to the genus Geastrum, or earthstar genus. It is found in Costa Rica and Mexico. G. albonigrum can be distinguished from superficially similar species G. coronatum and G. lloydianum by the presence of a rhizomorph on its exoperidium.

References

External links
 Index Fungorum
 MycoBank

albonigrum
Fungi of Central America
Inedible fungi
Fungi described in 2004